USS LST-549 was a United States Navy  in commission from 1944 to 1946.

Construction and commissioning
LST-549 was laid down on 4 January 1944 at Evansville, Indiana, by the Missouri Valley Bridge and Iron Company. She was launched on 25 February 1944, sponsored by Mrs. E. A. Oberhuber, and commissioned on 5 April 1944.

Service history

During World War II, LST-549 was assigned to the Pacific Theater of Operations. She participated in the Morotai landings in September 1944. She then took part the Philippines campaign, in which she participated in the Leyte landings in October and November 1944, the Lingayen Gulf landings in January 1945, and the Mindanao Island landings in April 1945.

Following the war, LST-549 performed occupation duty in the Far East and saw service in China before departing in mid-February 1946 to return to the United States.

Decommissioning and disposal
LST-549 was decommissioned on 28 February 1946 and stricken from the Navy List on 5 December 1947. She was sold on 23 May 1948 to Consolidated Builders, Inc., of Morris Heights, the Bronx, New York, for scrapping.

Honors and awards
LST-549 earned four battle stars for World War II service.

References

NavSource Online: Amphibious Photo Archive USS LST-549

 

LST-542-class tank landing ships
World War II amphibious warfare vessels of the United States
Ships built in Evansville, Indiana
1944 ships